Alan Stewart (born 1960) is a Scottish cinematographer.

Born in Comrie, Perth and Kinross, Stewart first served as a tea boy for the camera crew of various productions, before gaining work as a clapper loader and focus puller, and eventually a camera operator working under the likes of Ellen Kuras and Seamus McGarvey. Stewart relocated to England in the mid-1990s, and in 1998, alongside Peter Middleton, was nominated for a BAFTA television award for his work on the BBC limited series Holding On. Stewart would work in the camera department on such film and television projects as Band of Brothers, Into the Woods, Ready Player One and Mary Poppins Returns, and was the second unit and third unit director for Elizabeth: The Golden Years, Fred Claus and Inkheart.

Stewart's biggest foray into serving as cinematographer was for Guy Ritchie's live action remake of Disney's Aladdin. Having previously worked in the camera department for Ritchie's films Sherlock Holmes, Sherlock Holmes: A Game of Shadows and King Arthur: Legend of the Sword, Stewart would serve as cinematographer for his next few films The Gentlemen, Wrath of Man and Operation Fortune: Ruse de Guerre. He was also the cinematographer for 2021's Tom & Jerry. His will next work on the Netflix film Our Man from Jersey.

Filmography

References

External links
Alan Stewart at the Internet Movie Database

1960 births
Living people
Scottish cinematographers
People from Perth and Kinross